Intwine is the first studio album by Dutch band Intwine. It was released on October 3, 2003 by Dureco.

Track listing
"Way Out" – 4:34
"Raven Claw" – 3:29
"Let Me Be" – 3:44
"Sorry" – 3:29
"Hello Again" – 4:07
"Obituary" – 3:23
"Today" – 6:03
"Happy?" – 3:29
"Feel Free" – 3:34
"Thin Ice" – 4:21
"Sleep in Silence" – 4:26
"Get Outta My Head" – 4:31

Personnel
Roger Peterson – vocals
Jacob Streefkerk – guitar
Touché Eusebius – bass guitar
Kevin Hissink – guitar  
Erwin Gielen – drums
Gordon Groothedde – production

2003 debut albums
Intwine albums